Alan Olmedo (born 24 June 1994) is a Paraguayan footballer who plays as a midfielder for Sportivo Iteño.

Career

Club career
Having formerly played for 12 de Octubre Football Club, Olimpia de Itá and Club Fulgencio Yegros, Olmedo joined Club Sportivo San Lorenzo for the 2018 season, which he helped with promotion to the Paraguayan Primera División in his first season. He played eight Paraguayan Primera División games for San Lorenzo in the 2019 season. In August 2019, he then moved to Atyrá FC.

On 31 December 2019 Peruvian Segunda División side Chavelines Juniors confirmed, that Olmedo had joined the club. In January 2021, Olmedo returned to Paraguay and joined Sportivo Iteño.

References

External links
 
 

Living people
1993 births
Association football midfielders
Paraguayan footballers
Paraguayan expatriate footballers
Paraguayan Primera División players
Club Olimpia (Itá) players
Club Sportivo San Lorenzo footballers
Sportivo Iteño footballers
People from Itauguá
Paraguayan expatriate sportspeople in Peru
Expatriate footballers in Peru